Kelly Cheung (born 11 May 1990) is a Hong Kong-born American actress and television host currently contracted to TVB. She is the winner of Miss Chinese International 2012 and represented Hong Kong at Miss World 2012.

Early life 
Cheung was born in Hong Kong and was raised there until she was ten years old before moving to Chicago where she attended St. Therese Chinese Catholic
School and later graduated from University of Illinois Chicago with a degree in Business Administration.

Career 
Cheung was 21 when she won the Miss Friendship Ambassador Pageant and represented Chicago at Miss Chinese International 2012. She was crowned the winner, becoming the only Chicago representative to have won the beauty pageant title. She was the winner of Friendship Ambassador as well. Cheung represented Hong Kong, China at Miss World 2012 in Ordos, Inner Mongolia, marking the first time a Miss Chinese International titleholder represented Hong Kong at Miss World instead of a Miss Hong Kong Pageant titleholder. This was due to the Miss World pageant timeframe shifting from November to August and thus conflicting with that of Miss Hong Kong Pageant. At Miss World Pageant 2012, Cheung entered top 47 in Top Model and top 40 in Beach Fashion.

Cheung relocated to Hong Kong and joined TVB after crowning her successor at Miss Chinese International in January 2013. With her fluent English, she joined the English language channel TVB Pearl and TVB Jade as a television presenter, hosting Dolce Vita and Pearl Entertainment Tonight, and Scoop (東張西望).

Cheung also had a successful modeling career prior to her pageant wins. She was awarded "Best New Model 2010" by Elite HK Model Management. She had appeared in numerous television commercials as well as featuring in fashion and beauty magazines.

In 2016, Cheung made her acting debut in the legal drama Law dis-Order. In 2019, she starred in the critical acclaimed medical drama Big White Duel, receiving attention from netizens. She gained recognition by winning the Most Improved Female Artiste award at the 2019 TVB Anniversary Awards.

Filmography

Television dramas (TVB)

Television dramas (Shaw Brothers Pictures)

Awards and nominations

References

External links 
 Kelly Cheung on Weibo
 Kelly Cheung profile at Miss World 2012 Organizer Site

1990 births
Actresses from Chicago
Hong Kong emigrants to the United States
American expatriate actresses in Hong Kong
Hong Kong film actresses
Female models from Illinois
University of Illinois Chicago alumni
American television actresses
Living people
Miss Chinese International winners
Miss World 2012 delegates
Models from Chicago
TVB actors
21st-century American women